Parotta or Porotta is a layered Indian and Sri Lankan flatbread made from Maida or Atta, alternatively known as flaky ribbon pancake. It is very common in the Indian states of Kerala and Tamil Nadu and widely available in other states like Karnataka and Maharashtra and countries like Malaysia, United Arab Emirates and Sri Lanka.

Porottas are often available as street food and in restaurants. At some places it is also served at weddings, religious festivals and feasts. It is prepared by kneading maida/wheat flour, egg (in some recipes), oil or ghee and water. The dough is beaten into thin layers and later forming a round spiralled into a ball using these thin layers. The ball is rolled flat and pan fried. It is often served with a meat curry, such as chicken, goat, beef, or lamb.

History
Parotta originated in the Tamil-populated Jaffna area of Sri Lanka, and the migrant workers from there introduced it as "Veechu Porotta" or "Ceylon Porotta" in coastal Tamil Nadu region of India. 
In Virudhunagar, traditionally,  the parotta is deep fried and is called annai (oil) parotta which is very different from either the veechu parotta or the Malabar parotta. This predates the veechu parotta and has been around for a long time.
Parotta became popular all over Kerala during the late 1960s or the early 1980s. During the 1990s, street hawkers (thattukadas) of Kerala further strengthened its status as a local food, and it came to be known as "Kerala Porotta" or  "Malabar Parotta" outside of Kerala, owing to the popularity of food from the Malabar region of Kerala which was always globally represented since British times .

Gallery

Health impact
Similar to any food product made from Maida (refined flour), Parotta / Porotta has been deemed unhealthy by some doctors. This has resulted in the introduction and popularization of "atta porotta", which is porotta fully made from atta (whole wheat flour) mostly available only in urban areas.

See also

 Paratha
 Pashti
 Roti prata/Roti canai
 List of Indian breads
 List of Indian dishes

References

External links

 Parotta making - A video filmed at a Tamil market diner (Dhaba)

Flatbreads
Indian breads
Indian cuisine
South Indian cuisine
Tamil cuisine
Kerala cuisine
Karnataka cuisine
Bengali cuisine